Xu is a Chinese-language surname. In the Wade-Giles system of romanization, it is spelled as "Hsu", which is commonly used in Taiwan. It is different from Xu (surname 許), represented by a different character.

Variations in other Chinese varieties and languages

In Wu Chinese including Shanghainese, the surname 徐 is transcribed as Zee, as seen in the historical place name Zikawei in Shanghai (Xujiahui in Pinyin). In Gan Chinese, it can be spelled Hi or Hé.

In Cantonese, 徐 is often transcribed as Tsui, T'sui, Choi, Chui or even Tsua.

In modern Vietnamese, the character 徐 is written Từ and Sy when migrating to the English-speaking World, particularly the United States. Other spellings include Hee and Hu.

In Japanese, the surname 徐 is transliterated as Omomuro (kunyomi) or Jo (onyomi or Sino-Japanese).

In Korean, 徐 is romanized as Seo in the Revised Romanization of Korean and written 서 in Hangul.

Origin 
According to legend, Ruomu was one of the two sons of Boyi. Boyi successfully assisted Yu the Great with resolving the Flood, so the King conferred one of the eight noble tribal names, Yíng, to the family of Boyi; and simultaneously Ruomu was appointed as the King of the land of Xú. This was the beginning of the establishment of the state Xú. The state has been reigned over by the royal family for more than a thousand years, and had 44 monarchs.

The state of Xú was eliminated by the state of Wú, since then in order to commemorate their ancestral pride, descendants of King Ruo'mu adopted their country's name, Xú, as their surname. Therefore, the surname, Xú, is originated from King Ruo'mu, and it belongs to the noble tribe of Yíng.

Jiangsu is the province with the highest concentration of the surname Xu.

People with surname
Agnes Hsu-Tang, American archaeologist, art historian, and philanthropist
Hsu Dao Hui (徐道輝 Stephen), American theoretical physicist and technology startup founder
Hsu Cheng-kuang, Minister of Mongolian and Tibetan Affairs Commission of the Republic of China (2000-2002)
Hsu Chen-wei (born 1968), county magistrate of Hualien Magistrate
Hsu Ching-chung (徐慶鐘), Vice Premier of the Republic of China (1972-1981)
Hsu Chun-yat, Minister of Public Construction Commission of the Republic of China (2014-2016)
Hsu Jan-yau, Governor of Taiwan Province (2016-2017)
Hsu Jo-ting, Taiwanese fencer
Hsu Kuo-yung, Minister of the Interior of the Republic of China
Hsu Li-teh, Vice Premier of the Republic of China (1993-1997)
Hsu Ming-chun, Deputy Mayor of Kaohsiung (2016-2018)
Hsu Ming-tsai, Mayor of Hsinchu City (2009-2014)
Hsu Ming-yuan, Deputy Minister of Council of Indigenous Peoples
Hsu Shui-teh, President of Examination Yuan (1993–1996)
Hsu Tsai-li, Mayor of Keelung City (2001–2007)
Hsu Tzong-li, President of Judicial Yuan
Hsu Yao-chang, Magistrate of Miaoli County
Xu Huang, (徐晃; died 227), Military General of the state of Cao Wei
Xu Sheng, Military General of the Eastern Wu
Xu Shu (徐庶, fl. 207–220s), courtesy name Yuanzhi, originally named Shan Fu, official of the state of Cao Wei
Xu Beihong (徐悲鴻; Wade–Giles: Hsü Pei-hung 1895 – 1953), also known as Ju Péon, prominent modern Chinese painter
Xu Guangqi, Chinese scholar-bureaucrat, agricultural scientist, astronomer and mathematician
Xu Jiyu, Chinese official and geographer
Xu Bing, Artist
Xu Chen, Badminton player
Xu Da, Ming dynasty general
Xu Datong, Chinese political scientist and legal scholar
Xu Deshuai, A Hong Kong footballer for South China
Xu Demei, Chinese javelin thrower
Xu Jie (Ming dynasty), (1503-1583), 44th Senior Grand Secretary of the Ming Dynasty
Xu Jun, Chess player
Xu Ling, Writer and editor
Xu Lu (徐璐, born 1994), also known as Lulu Xu, Chinese actress
Xu Minghao, (徐明浩, born 1997), Chinese member of the South Korean boyband Seventeen, known by his stage name The8
Xu Shouhui, Yuan dynasty rebel leader
Xu Wei, Ming dynasty painter
Xu Xiangqian, Chinese Communist Military leader
Xu Yang (Qing Dynasty), Qing Dynasty painter
Xu Yifan (徐一幡; born 1988 in Tianjin), a Chinese tennis player
Xu Yuan, Footballer
Xu Zizhou (徐自宙; born 1981), Chinese former track and field sprinter
Vivian Hsu (Atayal: Bidai Syulan; 徐若瑄; born 1975), Taiwanese singer and actress
Tsui Hark (徐克, Vietnamese: Từ Khắc, born 1950), born Tsui Man-kong (徐文光), Hong Kong film director, producer and screenwriter
Paula Tsui Siu-fung (徐小鳳), Cantopop singer in Hong Kong, with a career of spanning over 40 years
Tsui Po Ko, Renegade officer in the Hong Kong Police Force
Tsui Tin-Chau, Teacher and lecturer
Tsui Siu-Ming, Hong Kong-based actor, screenwriter, film producer, assistant director, and production manager
Charlie Kosei (real name Cheui Gwongsing), Jazz musician
Ban Tsui, Chinese Canadian Anesthesiologist
Ted Hsu, Canadian politician
Tsui Tsin-tong, Hong Kong entrepreneur, philanthropist and antique connoisseur
Xu Bin (徐彬), Chinese actor based in Singapore
Jeffrey Xu (徐鸣杰, born 1988 in Shanghai), Chinese actor in Singapore
Barbie Hsu (徐熙媛, born 1976 in Taipei, Taiwan), Taiwanese actress, singer, and television host
Xu Kaicheng (徐开骋, born 1990), Chinese actor
Xu Xiaodong (徐晓冬; born 1979), nicknamed "Mad Dog", Chinese mixed martial artist (MMA) who has been called the founder of MMA in China
Xu Can (徐灿; born 1994), Chinese professional boxer who has held the WBA (Regular) featherweight title since 2019
Xu Jiao (徐娇, born 1997), Chinese actress
Xu Shuzheng (徐樹錚, 1880 – 1925), Chinese warlord in Republican China, a subordinate and right-hand man of Duan Qirui of the Anhui clique
 Hsu Dau-lin (1907-1973, Tokyo, Japan, ancestry: Xiao County, Anhui), a distinguished legal scholar, son of Xu Shuzheng
Eric Xu Yong (徐勇; born 1964), Chinese businessman, co-founder of Baidu
Xu Dongdong (徐冬冬; born 1990), a Chinese actress and singer who first rose to prominence in 2016 for playing Shen Jiawen, a drug
Xu Shouhui (徐壽輝; died 1360), a 14th-century Chinese rebel leader who proclaimed himself emperor during the late Mongol Yuan Dynasty period
Chee Soon Juan (徐顺全; born 1962), a Singaporean politician and the current leader of the Singapore Democratic Party (SDP)
Xu Haiqiao (徐海喬; born 1983), also known as Joe Xu, a Chinese actor
Xu Fan (徐帆, born 1967), Chinese actress and Asian Film Awards winner
Empress Xu (Ming dynasty) (徐皇后, 1362 – 1407), the empress consort to the Yongle Emperor
Xu Chen (徐晨, born 1984), a badminton player from China
Xu Jinglei (徐静蕾, born 1974), Chinese actress and film director
Xu Fu (Hsu Fu; 徐福 or 徐巿, 255 BC - 195-155 BC.: pinyin: Xú Fú; Wade–Giles: Hsu2 Fu2; Japanese: 徐福 Jofuku or 徐巿 Jofutsu; Korean: 서복 Seo Bok or 서불 Seo Bul), a Qi alchemist and explorer
Xu Shaohua (徐少华; born 1958), a Chinese actor best known for his role as Tang Sanzang
Xu Huihui (徐慧慧, known professionally as Jade Xu) (born 1986), Chinese martial arts actress and multiple World Wushu Champion
 Xu Jie (Southern Tang) (868–943), Southern Tang politician
 Xu Jie (Ming dynasty) (1503–1583), Ming dynasty politician
 Xu Jie (table tennis) (born 1982), Chinese-Polish table tennis player
 Dee Hsu (徐熙娣; born 1978), more commonly known as Xiǎo S or Little S (小S), a Taiwanese television and film actress
 Xu Xiake (徐霞客; 1587 – 1641), born Xu Hongzu (徐弘祖), courtesy name Zhenzhi (振之), Chinese travel writer and geographer of the Ming dynasty
 Chinese barracks ship Xu Xiake
 Jeremy Tsui (Xu Zhengxi) (徐正溪, born 1985), Chinese actor
 Xu Geyang (徐歌阳; pinyin: Xú Gēyáng; born 1996), a singer from Shenyang, Liaoning, China
 Xu Zhimo born Xu Zhangxu, also known as Changhsu Hamilton Hsu (徐志摩; pinyin: Xú Zhìmó; 1897 – 1931), original name [(徐章垿; Wade–Giles: Hsü Chang-hsü), courtesy names Yousen (槱森; pinyin: Yǒusēn; Wade–Giles: Yu-sen) and later Zhimo, which he went by, an early 20th-century romantic Chinese poet
 Xu Xiang (徐翔; pinyin: Xú Xiáng; born February 1977 in Ningbo, Zhejiang), a former Chinese private placement investor
 Xu Jiayu (徐嘉余; born 1995), a Chinese competitive swimmer who specializes in the backstroke. He is the Olympic Silver medalist (2016
 Xu Caihou (徐才厚; 1943 – 2015), Chinese general in the People's Liberation Army (PLA)
 Xu Yunli (徐雲麗; born 1987), Chinese volleyball player
 Xu Lijia (徐莉佳; born 1987 in Shanghai), Chinese sailboat racer who won a bronze medal in women's Laser Radial class
 Xu Yunlong (徐雲龍; born 1979), Chinese former footballer
 Xu Zhijun (徐直军; born 1967), Chinese entrepreneur currently serving as deputy chairman and rotating chairman of the Huawei Technologies Co
 Xu Huaiji (徐怀冀; born 1989), Chinese former footballer
 Xu Huaiwen (徐怀雯; born 1975), Chinese-born German badminton player
 Xu Liang (徐亮; born 1981 in Shenyang), Chinese footballer
 Xu Ke (author) (徐珂; born 1869–1928), a Chinese author who wrote an "unofficial" history of the Qing Dynasty, Qing bai lei chao
 Xu Yihai (徐亿海; born 1990), former Chinese footballer
 Xu Xin (footballer) (徐新; born 1994), Chinese footballer
 Xu Yanwei (徐妍玮; born 1984 in Shanghai), an Olympic medal-winning swimmer
 Xu Lingyi (徐令义; born April 1958), Chinese politician and the current Deputy Secretary of the Central Commission for Discipline Inspection
 Xu Wu (徐武; born 1991), Chinese football player who currently plays for Shaanxi Chang'an Athletic in the China League
 Xu Xianping (徐宪平; born 1954), Chinese politician
 Xu Zonghan (徐宗漢), a medical doctor, heroine of the Xinhai Revolution, which overthrew China's Qing Dynasty in 1911
 Xu Yifan (徐一幡; born 1988 in Tianjin), tennis player from China
 Xu Gang (politician) (徐钢; born 1958), former Chinese official who spent most of his career in Fujian province
 Xu Zheng (actor) (徐崢; born 1972), Chinese actor and director best known for acting in comedic roles
 Xu Hui (徐惠; 627–650), female Chinese poet, "the first of all women poets of the Tang"
 Xu Youyu (徐友漁; born 1947 in Chengdu), Chinese scholar in philosophy
 Xu Ming (徐明, 1971–2015), billionaire entrepreneur, former owner of Dalian Shide F.C.
 Xu Ming (figure skater) (徐铭, born 1981), Chinese figure skater
 Xu Datong (徐大同; 1928 – 2019), Chinese political scientist and legal scholar, considered one of China's "Five Elders"
 Ying Xu (徐鹰; pinyin: Xú Yīng) a computational biologist and bioinformatician
 Xu Jianyi (徐建一; born December 1953 in Fushan District, Yantai, Shandong), former Chinese politician and entrepreneur
 Xu Xu, aka Hsu Yu (徐訏), was the pen name of Xu Boyu (徐伯訏; 11 November 1908 – 5 October 1980), an important figure in modern Chinese literature
 Xu Caidong (徐采栋; 1919 – 2016), Chinese metallurgist, politician, and academician
 Xu Ming (徐铭; born 1981 in Qiqihar, Heilongjiang), Chinese figure skater
 Xu Shichang (Hsu Shih-chang; 徐世昌; 1855 – 1939), President of the Republic of China
 Xu Xing (paleontologist) (徐星; born 1969), Chinese paleontologist who has named more dinosaurs than any other living paleontologist
 Xu Yongchang (1885 – 1959) (Hsu Yung-chang; 徐永昌; style name: Cichen (Tzu-chen)), Minister of Board of Military Operations of the Republic of China
 Xu Kuangdi (徐匡迪; born 1937), Chinese politician and scientist, best known for his term as Mayor of Shanghai
 Xu Yunli (徐云丽; born 1987), Chinese volleyball player
 Xu Yihai (徐亿海; born 1990), former Chinese footballer
 Xu Shousheng (徐守盛; born 1953), Chinese politician who was the former Communist Party Secretary of Hunan and Gansu provinces
 Xu Mian (徐勉) (466–535), of the Liang dynasty
 Xu Shang (徐商), an official of the Chinese dynasty Tang Dynasty
 Xu Aihui (徐爱辉; born 1978 in Heilongjiang), Chinese race walker
 Xu Teli (徐特立; 1877 – 1968), a politician of the People's Republic of China, the teacher of Mao Zedong etc.
 Xu Qian or George Hsu (徐謙; 1871-1940), a Chinese politician and scholar who made important contributions to the judicial system of modern China
 Xu Wu (徐武; born 1993), Chinese footballer who plays as a defender for Chongqing Lifan
 Xu Si (徐思, born 1998), Chinese professional snooker player
 Xu Xing (writer) (徐星；born 1956)
 Xu Qinan (徐芑南; born 1936), Chinese engineer and general designer of deep-sea research submersible Jiaolong
 Xu Feihong (徐飞洪) (born June 1964), Chinese diploma, the Ambassador of the People's Republic of China to Afghanistan
 Lala Hsu (徐佳瑩; born 1984), Taiwanese singer-songwriter
 Xu Lejiang (徐乐江; born 1959), a Chinese politician and former state-owned company executive
 Xu Fuguan (徐復觀); 1902/03 – 1982), a Chinese intellectual and historian who made notable contributions to Confucian studies
 Xu Sheng (徐盛, died c. 225), courtesy name Wenxiang, a military general serving under the warlord Sun Quan in the late Eastern Han dynasty
 Xu Jian (Tang dynasty) (徐堅; 659–729), Tang dynasty writer and official
 Xu Jian (softball) (徐健; born 1970), Chinese softball player
 Xu Changsheng (徐常胜), a Chinese computer scientist who is a professor at the Institute of Automation of the Chinese Academy of Sciences
 Madame Huarui or Consort Xu (徐惠妃) (c. 940 – 976), a concubine of Later Shu's emperor Meng Chang during imperial China's Five Dynasties and Ten Kingdoms period
 Xu Pu (徐溥, 1429–1499), a minister during the reign of the Ming dynasty Hongzhi Emperor
 Xu Chan (徐蕆), a 12th century scholar, who wrote a preface to the 韻補 Yunbu of 吳域 Wu Yu (circa 1100-1154) in which he first proposed the xiesheng hypothesis
 Xu Wu (徐武; born 1991), a Chinese football player playing for Shaanxi Chang'an Athletic in the China League
 Xu Shaohua (politician) (徐少华; born January 1958), a politician of the People's Republic of China
 Xu Xiaobing (徐肖冰; 1916 – 2009), a Chinese cinematographer, filmmaker, and photojournalist
 Joseph Xu Zhixuan (徐之玄; 1916 - 2008), a Chinese Roman Catholic Bishop of Roman Catholic Diocese of Chongqing, China
 Xu Zhongxing (徐中行; ? – 1578), a Chinese scholar-official of the Ming Dynasty
 Xu Qiling (徐起零; born 1962), lieutenant general (zhongjiang) of the People's Liberation Army (PLA)
 Xu Yitian (徐一天; born 1947), a vice admiral (zhongjiang) of the People's Liberation Army Navy (PLAN) of China
 Xu Jian (softball) (徐健; pinyin: Xú Jiàn; born July 27, 1970), Chinese Olympic softball player
 Xu Liangcai (徐良才; born 1968), Chinese military officer currently serving as commander of the People's Liberation Army in Macao
 Xu Ming (徐铭; born 1981 in Qiqihar, Heilongjiang), Chinese figure skater
 Xu Guoliang (徐国良; born February 1965), Chinese molecular geneticist
 Xu Zihua (徐自华; 1873–1935), a Chinese poet
 Xu Shilin (徐诗霖; born 1998), Chinese tennis player
 Xu Huaizhong (徐怀中; born 1929), Chinese novelist. He is best known for his novel Qianfengji which won the 10th Mao Dun Literature Prize
 Xu Lin (born 1963) (徐麟; born 1963), Chinese politician, who serving as the director of the State Council Information Office
 Empress Dowager Xu (徐太后, personal name unknown) (died 926), during the reign of her husband Wang Jian, was an empress dowager of the Chinese Five Dynasties and Ten Kingdoms period state Former Shu
 Xu Guangchun (徐光春; born 1944), a retired Chinese politician who served as the Communist Party Secretary of Henan
 Xu Junping (徐俊平), senior colonel in the People's Liberation Army who defected to the United States in December 2000
 Xu Yougang (徐友刚; born 1996), a Chinese footballer who currently plays for Liaoning F.C. in the China League One
 Chee Hong Tat (徐芳达 born 1974), Singaporean politician
 Xu Zhen (Chinese 徐震 born 1977,), multimedia artist living and working in Shanghai, China
 Xu Rong (general) (徐榮; died 192), military general serving under the warlord Dong Zhuo
 Xu Rong (badminton) (徐蓉; born 1958), retired female badminton player from China
 Augusta Xu-Holland (徐嘉雯; born 1991), Chinese New Zealand actress
 Xu Ping (徐苹; born 1960s?), penname: Xu Yigua (须一瓜), a Chinese writer based in Xiamen
 Xu Lai (actress) (徐来; Wade–Giles: Hsü Lai; 1909 – 1973), a Chinese film actress, socialite, and World War II secret agent
 Xu Fulin (徐傅霖; 1879 – 1958), a politician and legal scholar of the Republic of China
 Xu Bing (徐冰; born 1955), Chinese artist who served as vice-president of the Central Academy of Fine Arts
 Xu Zhongyu (徐中玉; 1915 – 2019), Chinese writer and literary scholar
 Xu Guoping (徐郭平; born 1962), a Chinese politician who served as the mayor of Taizhou of the Jiangsu Province
 Xu Wen (徐溫, 862 – 927, ancestry Qushan (朐山, in modern Lianyungang, Jiangsu), major general and regent of the Chinese Five Dynasties and Ten Kingdoms period state Wu
 Li Bian (889 – 943), born Xu Gao (徐誥), founder of Southern Tang
 Li Jing (Southern Tang) (916–961), Southern Tang emperor (937–939), originally Xu Jingtong (徐景通), briefly Xu Jing (徐璟)
 Xu Jing (table tennis) (徐竞; born 1968), Chinese-Taiwanese table tennis player
 Xu Jing (archer) (徐晶; born 1990), Chinese archer
 Xu You (Southern Tang) (徐游; c. 960 – ?)
 Xu Xianqing (徐顯卿; 1537–1602), courtesy name Gongwang (公望), pseudonym Jian'an (檢庵), Chinese statesman
 Jake Hsu (徐鈞浩; born 1990), Taiwanese actor
 Xu Genbao (徐根宝; born 1944 in Shanghai), Chinese football manager
 Xu Lin (born 1963) (徐麟), head of the Cyberspace Administration of China
 Xu Chi (徐迟; 1914 – 1996), Chinese writer, modernist poet and essayist in his early life, later working as a journalist
 Xu Xingye (徐兴业; 917 - 1990), Chinese novelist
 Princess Xu Zhaopei (徐昭佩) (died 549), an imperial princess of the Chinese Liang Dynasty
 Leetsch C. Hsu or Xu Lizhi (徐利治; 1920–2019), Chinese mathematician
 Lap-Chee Tsui or Xu Lizhi (徐立之; born 1950), Chinese-Canadian geneticist
 Xu Gang (cyclist) (徐刚; born 1984)
 Xu Fancheng (徐梵澄; 1909, Changsha - 2000, Beijing), also known as Hu Hsu and F.C. Hsu in India, a Chinese scholar and translator, indologist and philosopher
 T.C. Hsu (徐道覺; 1917 – 2003), Chinese American cell biologist
 Xu Wen (footballer) (徐文), born April 13, 1986 in Shanghai), a versatile Chinese footballer, who plays as either a defensive midfielder or defender
 Xu Haidong (徐海東; 1900 – 1970), senior general in the People's Liberation Army of China
 Xu Xiaoxi (徐小溪; born 1981 in Chengdu), Chinese film director and screenwriter
 Xu Xiangqian (徐向前 1901 – 1990), Chinese Communist military leader and one of the Ten Marshals of the People's Liberation Army
 Hsu Ming-yuan (徐明淵), a politician in the Republic of China who currently serves as the Deputy Minister of the Council of Indigenous Peoples of the Executive Yuan
 Xu Xi (painter) (徐熙; died before 975), Chinese painter in the Southern Tang kingdom during the Five Dynasties and Ten Kingdoms period
 Su Guaning (徐冠林; born 1951), a Singaporean academic and the President Emeritus of Nanyang Technological University (NTU)
 Xu Kecheng (徐克成"; born 1940), Chinese specialist in gastroenterology, hepatology and cancer treatment and president of Guangzhou Fuda Cancer Hospital
 Xu Da (徐達; 1332–1385), courtesy name Tiande, a Chinese military general who lived in the late Yuan dynasty and early Ming dynasty
 Xu Ze (徐泽; 1954), Chinese politician from Shandong, Guangdong
 Xu Zheng (Eastern Wu) (徐整), an Eastern Wu official and a Daoist author of the "Three Five Historic Records"
 Xu Xianzhi (徐羨之) (364–426), high-level official of the Chinese dynasty Liu Song
 Xu Yuanquan (徐源泉; Hsü Yüan-ch'üan; 1886–1960), a Kuomintang general
 Xu Guangxian (徐光宪; 1920 – 2015), also known as Kwang-hsien Hsu, a Chinese chemist
 Xu Yixin (徐以新) (1911 – 1994), an associate of the 28 Bolsheviks
 Xu Enzeng (徐恩曾) (1896–1985), Republic of China politician born in Wuxing, Huzhou, Zhejiang Province
 Xu Gan (徐幹; 171–218), courtesy name Weichang, a philosopher and poet of the late Eastern Han dynasty of China
 Hsu Yung-ming (徐永明; born 1966), Taiwanese political scientist, pollster, and politician
 Hsu Chih-ming (徐志明; born 1957), a Taiwanese politician who attended primary school in Daliao, Kaohsiung
 Shu Shien-Siu (徐賢修; 1912–2001), also known as S. S. Shu, a Chinese/Taiwanese mathematician, engineer and educator
 Xu Xusheng (徐旭生 1888 – January 4, 1976), also known by his courtesy name Xu Bingchang,was a Chinese archaeologist, historian, and explorer
 Xu Jingqian (徐景遷) (919-937), also known in some historical records as Li Jingqian (李景遷) (because his family would, after his death, change the surname to Li), posthumously honored as Prince Ding of Chu (楚定王), an official of the Chinese Five Dynasties and Ten Kingdoms Period state Wu
 Hsu Hsin-ying (徐欣瑩; born 1972), Taiwanese politician of the KMT
 Xu Dunxin (徐敦信) (born 1934), Chinese diplomat born in Yangzhou, Jiangsu
 Francis Hsu Chen-Ping (徐诚斌; 1920 – 23 May 1973), a Chinese clergyman
 Hsu Chen-wei (徐榛蔚; pinyin: Xú Zhēnwèi; born 12 October 1968), Taiwanese politician
 Xu Yulan (徐玉蘭; 1921 – 2017) born Wang Yulan (汪玉蘭), a Yue opera singer-actress who plays Sheng roles (all male characters)
 Xu Wan (徐綰; died 902), a general during the late Tang dynasty who served and later turned against the warlord Qian Liu
 Yuki Hsu (born 1978), Taiwanese singer and actress
 Tsui Sze-man (徐四民; 1914 – 2007), a pro-Beijing loyalist and magazine publisher based in Hong Kong
 Xu Yongjiu (徐永久; born 1964), Chinese former racewalking athlete
 Shyu Jong-shyong (徐中雄; born 1957), Taiwanese politician
 Heidi Shyu (徐若冰; born 1953), Taiwan-born United States Assistant Secretary of the Army for Acquisition, Logistics, and Technology
 Norman Hsu (徐詠芫 born 1951), a convicted pyramid investment promoter who associated himself with the apparel industry
 Teddy Zee (徐俠昌), a Chinese film producer/executive whose films (produced and supervised by him) have amassed over $2.6 billion in revenue
 Hsu Szu-chien (徐斯儉), Deputy Minister of Foreign Affairs of the Republic of China since 16 July 2018
 Charles Sew Hoy, Choie Sew Hoy (徐肇開; 1836–1901), also known as Charles Sew Hoy, a notable New Zealand merchant, Chinese leader and gold-dredger
 Xu Guoqing (徐国清; born 1958), Chinese judoka
 Shyu Jyuo-min (徐爵民), an engineer and politician in the Republic of China
 Hsu Feng (徐楓 born 1950), Taiwanese-born actress and film producer
 Chee Kim Thong (徐金棟; 1920-2001), Shaolin martial arts grandmaster
 Xu Zhilei (徐志雷, born April 16, 1988), known by his in-game tag BurNIng, Chinese professional gamer who plays Dota 2
 John Hsu (徐漢強), Taiwanese film director
 Hsu Jui-te (徐瑞德, born 1964), Taiwanese former cyclist who competed in two events at the 1988 Summer Olympics
 Tsui Tin-Chau (徐天就, born 1958 in Hong Kong) (ancestry: Guangdong, Zhongshan), Chinese-born Dutchman who is well known in the Chinese community in the Netherlands
 Anthony Zee (徐一鸿, b. 1945), a Chinese-American physicist, writer
 Che Chew Chan (徐萩玹, born 1982 in Pontian, Johor), Malaysian taekwondo practitioner
 Tsui Chi Ho (徐志豪; born 1990), Hong Kong sprinter
 Ding Yi (丁一; 1927 – 2019), Chinese electrical engineer and business executive, born in June 1927 as Xu Weiwen (徐纬文), in Penglai, Shandong
 Xu Yang (徐洋, born 1987 in Shandong), Chinese professional football player
 Li Jingsui (920-958), born Xu Jingsui (徐景遂), prince of Southern Tang
 Tsui Po-ko (徐步高) (1970 – 2006), police constable in the Hong Kong Police Force
 Tsui Go-Sha Misha (1978 – ), UGRS plumber in the YKT city Gaz force
 Lap-Chee Tsui, (徐立之; born 1950), Chinese-born Canadian geneticist and President of the University of Hong Kong
 Hsu Yao-chang (徐耀昌; born 1955), Taiwanese politician
 Ciputra (Tjie Tjin Hoan), (1931–2019), Indonesian businessman
 Fei Xu (徐绯; born 1969), Chinese-born American developmental psychologist and cognitive scientist
 Xu Ziyin (徐紫茵; born 1996), Chinese singer, dancer, and actress
 Xu RenWei (徐任炜; born 1972) is a Chinese

Fictional 
 Xu Ning (徐寧) is a fictional character in Water Margin.
 Xu Qing (徐慶), nicknamed "Mountain Rat" (穿山鼠) because he can quickly traverse mountain caves, is a fictional Song dynasty knight-errant from the 19th-century Chinese novels The Seven Heroes and Five Gallants and The Five Younger Gallants.
 Xu Shang-Chi (徐尚氣),Xu Shang-Chi[a] (English: /ˈʃuː ʃɑːŋˈtʃiː/ SHOO shahng-CHEE) is a fictional character portrayed by Simu Liu in the Marvel Cinematic Universe (MCU) multimedia franchise, based on the Marvel Comics character of the same name. In the franchise, Shang-Chi is the son of Ying Li and Xu Wenwu, the founder and first leader of the Ten Rings terrorist organization. Trained to be a highly skilled martial artist and assassin by his father, alongside his sister Xialing, Shang-Chi left the Ten Rings for a normal life in San Francisco, only to be drawn back into the world he left behind when Wenwu seeks him out.

See also
Seo (Korean surname)
Từ (Vietnamese name)

References

External links

Chinese-language surnames